Dagur Sigurðarson (6 August 1937 – 19 February 1994) was an Icelandic poet, translator and visual artist.

Family 
His maternal niece is Katrín Jakobsdóttir, the current Prime Minister of Iceland.

Books 

 Shares in the Sunset - 1958
 The Millennium Adventure - 1960
 The Dog Farm or the Reconstruction of the Economy - 1963
 Níðstaung hin meiri - 1965
 Some American Poems - 1966 (translations)
 Rough metal and gray silver - 1971
 Conscious widening of the buttocks - 1974
 The Queen of the Jungle Sacrifices Tarsan - 1974
 Fagurskinna - 1976
 Karlson and kerling hel - 1976
 Ordinary Housewife - 1977
 Sunshine Fool - 1980
 Before Laugavegur eruption - 1985
 Kella is not related to them - 1988
 Glímuskjálfti - 1989 (Total collection of poems of the day)

References 

1994 deaths

1937 births
20th-century Icelandic poets
Icelandic artists
Icelandic translators